The Young Fabians Economy & Finance Network is a special interest group of the youth section of the Fabian Society, the UK's leading centre-left think tank.

About 
The network originated as a grouping of finance professionals within the Young Fabians. It evolved to provide a general forum for progressives that have an interest in finance and economics. The network developed the first Young Fabians issue-specific journal Anatomy and has done work on UK Government budgets, reforms of the banking sector, housing, alternative financial services and youth financial education.

The network organises an annual programme of policy round-tables, publications, and panel events involving public figures from the worlds of finance, industry, public policy and economic thought.

Chairs 

Chairs of Young Fabians Finance Network are elected at an annual AGM's and hold office for one year.

See also 
 Fabian strategy
 Gradualism
 Keir Hardie
 Labour Research Department
 List of UK think tanks
 Reformism
 Social democracy
 Fabian Society
 Democratic socialism
 Ethical movement

Young Fabian Press
Anticipations –  Print magazine of the Young Fabians
 Anatomy – Policy project-centric serial

See also 
List of UK think tanks

External links 
Young Fabians Website

Political and economic think tanks based in the United Kingdom
Fabian Society